Still Crazy is a 1998 British comedy film directed by Brian Gibson (his final film before his death in 2004). The plot concerns a fictional 1970s rock band named Strange Fruit, who, after being split up for two decades, are persuaded to get back together to perform at a reunion in the same concert venue where they played their last gig. The film focuses on the personal lives of the band members and those closest to them, and their individual experiences with approaching middle-age and the success that eluded them.

It was nominated for two Golden Globes in 1999.

Plot 
The band Strange Fruit performs at the 1977 Wisbech Rock Festival. Hughie Case tells how, due to the pursuit of "fame, fortune and fornication" – and the drug overdose of their original singer, Keith Lovell – this is their last performance. After various issues, the band prematurely ends their performance, frustrated over competing egos and members' lack of self-control.

Twenty years later, a stranger who turns out to be the Festival's founder's son recognises keyboardist Tony Costello and convinces him to reunite the band for an anniversary show. Tony tracks down Karen Knowles, their original runaround-girl. Reluctant, she is inspired to return after finding memorabilia. She insists on being the manager, and Tony agrees. Gradually, Karen and Tony track down other members: bassist Les Wickes, now a family man and roofer; drummer David "Beano" Baggot, working at a nursery and on the run from the taxman; and lead singer Ray Simms who, after years of drug and alcohol abuse, is now sober. Though claiming to be working on a solo album, Simms has not released anything in ten years.

The band meets up at the Red Lion pub. Everyone expects Brian Lovell, the band's lead guitarist, to be there. Karen says she could not find him but learned he donated his royalties to charity; everyone assumes he died. Their roadie, Hughie, turns up during their first rehearsal to resume his original role. Ray insists on playing guitar but is convinced to sing. They find a replacement for Brian in young Luke Shand, a talented guitarist who remains unaware of the band's tensions.

Following a warm up European tour, Karen negotiates for the rights to their catalogue. Their initial performances are poorly received. Les, Beano, and Hughie hold little hope for the band, believing the dead Keith and missing Brian to be the main talent. Tony propositions Karen, but she resists, remaining attached to Brian. At a gig, Ray's over-the-top ideas backfire, and Les and Ray walk off. Following a confrontation with Les, Ray has a nervous breakdown, exacerbated by turning 50. Ray leaves the gig, buys drugs, and falls into a canal. Karen's daughter rescues him, and Ray's wife blames Karen for his troubles. Following an angry reaction from locals over volume levels, the band escape to their bus and flee.

Les and Ray make up, and Ray says he "received a positive message" from Brian's ghost. The bus breaks down, and Karen confronts the band about their lack of confidence. When the band meet a girl wearing a Strange Fruit tour T-shirt that belonged to her father, they take it as a positive omen. The next few shows go well; the band becomes more optimistic. Following a record deal, the band records a new song written and sung by Les, which Ray had never previously allowed. However, after watching a recorded drunken TV interview in which Les and Beano imply that the band was better with Keith and Brian, Ray breaks down again and quits.

As the band members return to their former lives, Karen and Claire visit Keith's grave to pay their respects. They find a note that quotes "The Flame Still Burns", a tribute to Keith written by Brian. Hughie is then confronted by Karen, and reluctantly admits he knows Brian is alive. Karen and Tony find Brian in a psychiatric hospital. He explains he gave up his material possessions to sever himself from his previous life. When he agrees to rejoin the band, the others follow. However, at a pre-show press conference, hostile questions cause Brian to walk out. Everyone but Luke follows, and Luke chastises the journalists. Visibly shaken, Brian decides to back out of the show but gives his blessing.

Beano nearly misses the set when a stalker-groupie demands sex. The band starts their set with the same song with which they opened up the last Wisbech Festival. Though Ray's confidence is shaken, Tony saves him by playing "The Flame Still Burns". Brian is pleased to hear the band playing the song, which helps him finally overcome his demons, and joins the band onstage to play an inspiring guitar solo, much to everyone's surprise and delight.

Cast 
 Bill Nighy as Ray Simms
 Juliet Aubrey as Karen Knowles
 Billy Connolly as Hughie Case
 Stephen Rea as Tony Costello
 Jimmy Nail as Les Wickes
 Timothy Spall as David "Beano" Baggot
 Hans Matheson as Luke Shand
 Bruce Robinson as Brian Lovell
 Lee Williams as young Keith Lovell
 Rachael Stirling as Clare Knowles
 Helena Bergström as Astrid Simms
 Alphonsia Emmanuel as Camille
 Phil Daniels as Neil Gaydon
 Peter Baynham as Karen’s boss
 Zoë Ball as herself
 Frances Barber as Lady in Black
 Rupert Penry-Jones as young Ray
 Virginia Clay as young Karen
 Luke Garrett as young Hughie
 Gavin Kennedy as young Tony
 Alex Palmer as young Les
 Sean McKenzie as young "Beano"
 Matthew Finney as young Brian

Reception

Critical response
Review aggregator Rotten Tomatoes gives the film a 73% approval rating based on 26 reviews and an average score of 6.56/10. The site's critics consensus reads: "Still Crazy can't completely escape the shadow left by the classic rock mockumentaries of the past, but it earns a commendable number of laughs in its own right." Rolling Stones Peter Travers praised Brian Gibson's direction for crafting a "solid blend of humor and heart", the performances from the main cast (highlighting Nighy's portrayal of Ray), and the musical contributions from Mick Jones and Chris Difford for capturing '70s rock bombast, calling it a "prime piece of entertainment." Entertainment Weeklys Lisa Schwarzbaum gave the movie a B+ rating, saying "The ensemble acting is fun, generous, and gentle, and the music […] is as good as Strange Fruit ought to be, with classically grandiose '70s poetic sentiments. When the band hits its reunion climax, Still Crazy encourages frankly emotional tears. And why not: There's nothing more comforting than the sight of grizzled old guys rocking on while the rest of us buy a ticket to feel young." Marc Savlov from The Austin Chronicle gave initial praise to the film's "wicked comic energy" found early on, but felt it devolves into "a deadly dull mishmash" it never gets out of, saying "The problem with Still Crazy isn't that it's overly earnest (which it is) or that it's too easy to make fun of (minimum effort required), it's that cast and crew alike seem primed for comedy in the film's first half, and then abruptly depart those Nigel Tufnel-ed plains in favor of some serious soul-searching halfway in." Joshua Klein of The A.V. Club found the film "overly dramatic and often dull" compared to This Is Spinal Tap and The Rutles, saying that if you look past its "cheap charm" you have a mishandled topic about middle-aged former rockers who lack sympathy for viewers to care about.

Accolades
In 1999, Still Crazy received two nominations at the 56th Golden Globe Awards for Best Motion Picture – Musical or Comedy and Best Original Song for "The Flame Still Burns" by Chris Difford, Marti Frederiksen and Mick Jones, but lost both awards to Shakespeare in Love and "The Prayer" from Quest for Camelot respectively.

Soundtrack

Strange Fruit songs 
The songs that the band Strange Fruit perform in the film are:

 "The Flame Still Burns"
 "All Over the World"
 "Dirty Town"
 "Black Moon"
 "Bird on a Wire"
 "Scream Freedom"
 "Dangerous Things"
 "What Might Have Been"

Also, "Stealin'" is performed by Billy Connolly's character.

References

External links 
 
 

1998 films
1998 comedy films
British comedy films
Columbia Pictures films
1990s English-language films
Fictional musical groups
Films about music and musicians
Films directed by Brian Gibson
Films shot at Pinewood Studios
Films with screenplays by Dick Clement
Films with screenplays by Ian La Frenais
Films set in the Netherlands
1990s British films